The 1951 Formula One season was the fifth season of FIA Formula One motor racing. It featured the 1951 World Championship of Drivers, which commenced on 27 May 1951 and ended on 28 October after eight races. The season also included 14 races open to Formula One cars but did not count towards the championship standings.

World Championship season summary
Ferrari's newer, naturally aspirated 4.5-litre cars offered a real challenge to the Alfas, which were nearing the end of their development potential. The Ferraris were able to capitalize on the inefficiency of the Alfa's very thirsty engines, particularly at Silverstone. Although Alfas won four races, with Fangio taking the championship, Ferrari's three victories spelled the end for the Alfas. BRM made their only championship appearance with the V16 at Silverstone, and the old, slow Talbots were increasingly outclassed.

Points were given to the top 5 finishers (8, 6, 4, 3, 2). One point was given for the fastest lap. Only the best four of eight scores counted towards the world championship. Points for shared drives were divided equally between the drivers, regardless of who had driven more laps.

Pre-season non-championship races
Although the official championship season would start in late May in Switzerland, a handful of non-championship events were to be run. The first was the first-ever Syracuse Grand Prix near the ancient city of Syracuse on the southern island of Sicily. This race was won by Italian Luigi Villoresi driving the new 4 1/2 litre Ferrari 375 on the  public road circuit. Villoresi would triumph again two weeks later at Pau in southwest France over homeland hero Louis Rosier and Nino Farina, driving a Maserati for this race. On the same day, Thai driver Birabongse Bhanudej would triumph at the Richmond Trophy race at Goodwood in southern England in his Maserati. 

Three weeks after the Goodwood and Pau races, it was the San Remo Grand Prix in western Italy, not far from Monaco. Alberto Ascari made his first appearance of the season and promptly won in a Ferrari 375 on this twisty and demanding  street circuit, ahead of his countryman Dorino Serafini and Swiss Rudi Fischer, both in Ferraris. A week later was the Bordeaux Grand Prix in western France, and it was won by Rosier in a Talbot, ahead of Fischer and Briton Peter Whitehead in a Ferrari. Besides Farina, this race did not feature any Italians because they were competing in the Mille Miglia.

A week later was the BRDC International Trophy race at Silverstone, with the Alfa Romeos making their first appearance in 1951. Of the first two heats, Fangio won the first while Farina won the second, and Reg Parnell won the final all-important event, which was stopped because of torrential rain and flooding. Two weeks after this was the Paris Grand Prix in the Bois de Boulogne Park in the French capital city, which Farina won in a Maserati.

Race 1: Switzerland

A week after the BRDC International Trophy race, the Formula One Championship season started in Switzerland at the very dangerous and tree-lined Bremgarten public road circuit near Bern around the time the Monaco Grand Prix would have been held, but that historic race was not held this year. Alfa Romeo, the dominant team in 1950 with its supercharged 159 Alfetta, took the first five places on the grid, except 3rd, which Luigi Villoresi took in a Ferrari. Argentine Juan Manuel Fangio was on pole position, with his Italian teammate Giuseppe "Nino" Farina alongside him. The race started while it was raining, and with its overhanging trees lining the road, this circuit was even more dangerous in the wet. But Fangio made no mistake and won the race from Piero Taruffi in a Ferrari and Farina, whose decision to run the race without changing tires proved wrong.

Race 2: Indianapolis 500

The Indianapolis 500 in the United States was run three days after the Swiss Grand Prix on a Wednesday. It was the only non-European championship round and the only round that was not run to FIA Grand Prix regulations. Lee Wallard won this demanding race in his Kurtis Kraft-Offenhauser.

Race 3: Belgium

Farina had won again at Ulster Trophy held at the very dangerous and fast Dundrod circuit in Northern Ireland in an Alfa, and the next championship Grand Prix was in Belgium at the fastest circuit of the year: the spectacular and rural  Spa-Francorchamps circuit. With Fangio and Farina once again 1–2 with the Ferraris of Villoresi and Alberto Ascari taking 3rd and 4th, the Alfas and Ferraris dueled around this circuit, with only 13 entries – small grids in all kinds of motorsports in Europe were commonplace at Spa, because of the fear most drivers had of the circuit. Farina, already on a high after winning at Dundrod, won by three minutes over Ascari and Villoresi, with Fangio finishing four laps down in 9th after one of his Alfa's wheels jammed on its hub.

Race 4: France

The French Grand Prix, given the honorary designation of the European Grand Prix this year, was held at the very fast  Reims-Gueux circuit (a circuit only two mph slower than Spa) deep in northern French champagne country played the host for an exciting race. Fangio, on pole again, was beaten off the line by 3rd-placed qualifier Ascari, with 2nd-placed qualifier Farina making a terrible start and dropping to 11th. On this triangular public road circuit, made up entirely of long straights, slight kinks, and slow, angular corners saw Ascari retire his car with a broken gearbox and Fangio nursing a sick car. Farina pushed very hard and eventually took the lead. Argentine José Froilán González was 2nd in a Ferrari, and 53-year old pre-war great Luigi Fagioli in an Alfa was 3rd in a one-off appearance this year. Gonzalez was chasing Farina very hard, but Farina's car developed magneto problems and had to fall back, which put Gonzalez in the lead, with Fagioli in 2nd. However, during both the leader's pitstops, as was commonplace in Grand Prix racing up until 1957, when it was banned – Gonzalez handed his car over to Ascari, and Fagioli exchanged his healthy car with Fangio's mechanically unhealthy car, so Ascari and Fangio were back in 1st and 2nd where they had been before. But Fangio took advantage of Ascari's brake problems on his Ferrari (the Reims-Gueux circuit was very hard on engines and brakes) to win a race that holds the record for farthest racing distance ever completed for a Grand Prix, . Fagioli, finishing 22 laps down and furious over having to swap cars with Fangio, quit Grand Prix racing on the spot. The veteran Italian would die after crashing a Lancia during a sportscar race at Monaco in 1952.

Race 5: Britain

The British Grand Prix at the Silverstone airfield circuit in England played host to round 5 of the World Championship, and this race was to make history. The Alfa Romeos, with their powerful 420 hp supercharged 1.5L engines were fast but had horrendous fuel consumption: 1.5 miles per gallon (thanks to the relatively simple pre-World War II engine design), meaning that Fangio and Farina had to stop twice to refuel, José Froilán González in the more fuel-efficient 4.5L naturally aspirated V12 Ferrari went on to win, with Fangio second. This was the first time Enzo Ferrari had won a Grand Prix with a car of his own company's construction, and this team went on to be the most successful in Formula One history.

Race 6: Germany

A week after the British Grand Prix, the non-championship Dutch Grand Prix at the fast beachside Zandvoort circuit near Amsterdam was won by Louis Rosier in a Talbot, ahead of veteran Phillippe Etancelin and up-and-comer Stirling Moss in an HWM.

West Germany had been banned from international sports competitions until 1951, so the German Grand Prix was able to be a Grand Prix championship round for the first time since 1939. The venue was the same as it had been in 1939 – it was the dauntingly challenging, dangerous, and twisty  Nürburgring Nordschleife. Ascari took pole position in front of his teammate Gonzalez and Alfa drivers Fangio and Farina. At the start, Farina took the lead, but the Alfas started to develop overheating problems, and Farina soon retired. In addition to engine problems, the gearbox in Fangio's Alfa lost 1st and 2nd of four gears. After trading the lead with Fangio during pitstops, Ascari took the lead and won his first championship Formula One Grand Prix.

Race 7: Italy

A week after the German Grand Prix was the Albi Grand Prix on a high-speed and dangerous public road circuit outside the southwestern French village of Albi. Maurice Trintignant won this race in a Simca. Two weeks later, Fangio won the Bari Grand Prix in the small southeastern Italian coastal city. 

Italy was the next championship race, and the Monza Autodrome near Milan played host to the seventh round of the Formula One Grand Prix championship. Fangio, in an Alfa, pole position again, but he retired his car, which had engine problems; Farina, who had taken Felice Bonetto's Alfa, had a leaking fuel tank and had to come in twice for fuel, which dropped him down the order far enough for him only to get as far as third. Fellow local hero and Milan native Ascari won again in his Ferrari–which kept his championship hopes alive to catch the leader Fangio going into the last championship Grand Prix in Spain.

Race 8: Spain

The last non-championship race of the year, the Goodwood Trophy, was won by Farina in an Alfa three weeks after the Italian Grand Prix.

The first ever Formula One Spanish Grand Prix, held at the Pedralbes street circuit in Barcelona, took place four weeks after the Goodwood Trophy race. The Ferrari and Alfa Romeo teams each ran four cars, with Ferrari fielding Ascari, Gigi Villoresi, Froilan Gonzalez, and Piero Taruffi and Alfa Romeo running Fangio, Giuseppe Farina, Felice Bonetto, and Baron Emanuel de Graffenried. Ascari was fastest in practice and shared the front row of the 4–3–4 grid with Fangio, Gonzalez, and Farina. Behind them were Villoresi, de Graffenried and Taruffi. Ascari led from the start, with Gonzalez chasing, but by the end of the first lap, Gonzalez had dropped to fifth behind Farina, Fangio, and Bonetto. Fangio quickly passed Farina and took the lead from Ascari on the fourth lap. As Fangio sailed away to victory, Ferrari's challenge fell apart along with its tires – the team having opted to use smaller wheels than normal. By the time the team had sorted out the problem, Ascari was two laps behind. Fangio duly won the race and his first of five championships, with Gonzalez finishing second and Farina third.

Season review

The World Championship Grand Prix races were open to FIA Formula One cars except the Indianapolis 500, which also counted to the 1951 AAA Championship, and was restricted to American Championship Cars.

Teams and drivers
The following teams and drivers competed in the 1951 FIA World Championship of Drivers. The list does not include those that contested only the Indianapolis 500 event.

World Championship of Drivers standings

Points were awarded on an 8–6–4–3–2 basis to the first five finishers at each Grand Prix, with an additional point for the fastest lap. Only the best four results counted towards the championship. Numbers without parentheses are championship points; numbers in parentheses are total points scored.

 † Position shared between two or more drivers of the same car

Non-championship races
Other Formula One races, which did not count towards the World Championship, were also held in 1951.

Notes and references

External links
 The Formula One Archives at www.silhouet.com
 1951 World Championship results and images at f1-facts.com

Formula One seasons